is a railway station in the city of Tajimi, Gifu Prefecture, Japan, operated by Central Japan Railway Company (JR Tōkai).

Lines

Layout
The station has two ground-level  side platforms connected by a footbridge. The station is staffed.

Platforms

Adjacent stations

|-
!colspan=5|JR Central

History
It was opened as a full passenger station on 1 November 1952 as part of Japan National Railways. Between Kokokei Station and Jōkōji Station, the line runs through the Aigi Tunnel. This opened in 1966, as part of the doubling and electrification of the railway, replacing a series of tunnels on a route that ran closer to the edge of the river. On 1 April 1987, it became part of JR Tōkai.

Passenger statistics
In fiscal 2015, the station was used by an average of 485 passengers daily (boarding passengers only).

Surrounding area
Shōnai River

See also
 List of Railway Stations in Japan

References

External links

Railway stations in Japan opened in 1952
Railway stations in Gifu Prefecture
Stations of Central Japan Railway Company
Chūō Main Line
Tajimi, Gifu